I'll may refer to

 "I'll", meaning "I will" or "I shall", a contraction (grammar)
 I'll (manga)
 "I'll", a song by Band-Maid from Unleash
 "I'll", a song by Dir En Grey
 I'll (singer), South Korean singer